In mathematics, the Kneser–Tits problem, introduced by  based on a suggestion by Martin Kneser, asks whether the Whitehead group W(G,K) of a semisimple  simply connected isotropic algebraic group G over a field K is trivial. The Whitehead group is the quotient of the rational points of G by the normal subgroup generated by K-subgroups isomorphic to the additive group.

Fields for which the Whitehead group vanishes

A special case of the Kneser–Tits problem asks for which fields the Whitehead group of a semisimple almost simple  simply connected isotropic algebraic group is always trivial.
 showed that this Whitehead group is trivial for  local fields K, and gave examples of fields for which it is not always trivial. For global fields the combined work of several authors shows that this Whitehead group is always trivial .

References

External links
 

Algebraic groups
Conjectures